Im Hwa-dong (born 1938) is a South Korean long-distance runner. He competed in the marathon at the 1956 Summer Olympics.

References

1938 births
Living people
Athletes (track and field) at the 1956 Summer Olympics
South Korean male long-distance runners
South Korean male marathon runners
Olympic athletes of South Korea
Place of birth missing (living people)
20th-century South Korean people